Live is the second live album by English hard rock band Thunder, and the first released outside of Japan. Recorded over four shows in November 1997 at Wulfrun Hall in Wolverhampton and Shepherd's Bush Empire in London, it was produced by the band's lead guitarist Luke Morley and engineered and mixed by Mike Fraser. The album was released by Eagle Rock Entertainment on 16 February 1998. An accompanying video was released by Eagle Vision on 28 March 1998.

Following the departure of Mikael "Micke" Höglund in 1996, Live is the first release by Thunder to feature bassist Chris Childs. It is also the band's first release on the Eagle label, with whom they signed in November 1997. The album features multiple songs from all four of the band's studio albums released up to that point, as well as a number of cover versions. Live reached number 35 on the UK Albums Chart, while the video album reached number 10 on the UK Music Video Chart.

Live was promoted on its own concert tour which began with shows across Europe on 3 March 1998. The tour later featured a leg of UK performances in May and June, followed by a run of Japanese dates in June and early July. The band also supported Status Quo on a European tour in April. "The Only One" was released as a single alongside a studio recording of the song on 26 January 1998, reaching number 31 on the UK Singles Chart and number 38 on the Scottish Singles Chart.

Background and recording
After three "warm-up shows" in Belgium and the Netherlands, Thunder recorded Live on 12 and 13 November 1997 at Wulfrun Hall in Wolverhampton, and 15 and 16 November 1997 at Shepherd's Bush Empire in London. On 26 January 1998, the band released the single "The Only One", which included a disc featuring four tracks from the album's live recordings. The single reached number 31 on the UK Singles Chart and number 38 on the Scottish Singles Chart. The album was released in the UK on 16 February 1998, debuting at number 35 on the UK Albums Chart, number 75 on the Scottish Albums Chart, and number 1 on the UK Rock & Metal Albums Chart. The album was released in Japan five days later, featuring bonus tracks "Pilot of My Dreams", "Everybody Wants Her" and "Stand Up".

Promotion and release
The Live video album was released in Japan on 28 March and in the UK on 30 March. The video features 16 of the 25 tracks featured on the live album, while special editions were released with a bonus CD featuring 12 recordings. The Live video album debuted at number 33 on the UK Music Video Chart, peaking at number 10 the following week. Several tracks were later featured on the live compilation album The Best of Thunder Live!, released in 2004. Live was promoted on a concert tour beginning with a European stint starting in Paris on 3 March, followed by a leg of UK shows between 11 May and 11 June, two European festival appearances, and a short Japanese run of dates between 30 June and 4 July. The band also played as a support act for Status Quo in Europe between 17 April and 7 May.

Track listings

Live album

Video album

Personnel
Danny Bowes – vocals
Luke Morley – guitar, backing vocals, harmonica, production
Ben Matthews – guitar, keyboards, backing vocals
Chris Childs – bass, backing vocals
Gary "Harry" James – drums, percussion, backing vocals, guitar
Mike Fraser – recording, engineering, mixing

References

External links
Live on Thunder's official website
Live (video) on Thunder's official website

1998 live albums
1998 video albums
Thunder (band) albums
Eagle Rock Entertainment live albums
Eagle Rock Entertainment video albums
Victor Entertainment live albums